The Last Supper refers to the last meal that Jesus Christ took with his disciples.

The Last Supper may also refer to:

Artwork
Depictions of the Last Supper in Christian art:
 Last Supper (del Castagno), a 1447 painting by Andrea del Castagno
 Last Supper (Rosselli) (1481–1482), a fresco by Biagio d'Antonio in the Sistine Chapel
 Last Supper (Perugino) (1493–1496), a fresco by Pietro Perugino
 The Last Supper (Leonardo) (1495–1498), a mural painting by Leonardo da Vinci
 Altarpiece of the Holy Sacrament or Last Supper, a 1464–1467 painting in a triptych altarpiece by Dieric Bouts
 Last Supper (Ghirlandaio), a 1480 painting by Domenico Ghirlandaio
 The Last Supper, a 1542 painting by Jacopo Bassano
 The Last Supper (1555–1562), a painting by Vicente Juan Masip
 The Last Supper (Tintoretto), a 1594 painting by Tintoretto
 The Last Supper, a 16th-century painting by Plautilla Nelli
 The Last Supper (Crespi) (1624–1625), by Daniele Crespi
 Last Supper (Rubens) (1630–1631), a 1631 painting by Peter Paul Rubens
 The Last Supper, a 1648 painting by Philippe de Champaigne
 Last Supper, a 17th-century painting by Nicolas Poussin
 The Last Supper, a 1721 painting by Gustavus Hesselius
 The Last Supper, an 1861 painting by Nikolai Ge
 The Last Supper, a 19th-century painting by Pascal Dagnan-Bouveret
 The Last Supper (Nolde), a 1909 painting by Emil Nolde
 The Last Supper (Pisani), a 1917 painting by Lazzaro Pisani
 The Sacrament of the Last Supper (1955), by Salvador Dalí
 The Last Supper (Warhol), a (1984-1986) series of paintings by Andy Warhol
 The Last Supper: Spirit, Flesh, Blood, 2006 series of paintings by Igor Kalinauskas

Film
 The Last Supper (1976 film), an historical film by Tomás Gutiérrez Alea
 Last Supper (1992 film), BBC television film directed by Robert Frank
 The Last Supper (1994 film), a Canadian drama by Cynthia Roberts
 The Last Supper (1995 film), a comedy-drama starring Cameron Diaz
 The Last Supper (2003 film), a South Korean comedy
 The Last Supper (2006 film), a comedic short film
 The Last Supper (2012 film), a Chinese historical film
 The Last Supper (2014 film), an Indian thriller film
 Last Supper (2014 film), also titled Going to America, an American film

Music
 The Last Supper (Black Sabbath video), a video/DVD featuring the band's live onstage shows from their 1999 U.S tour
 The Last Supper, a 1995 album by Belphegor
 The Last Supper (Jim Gaffigan album), 2004
 The Last Supper (Grave Digger album), 2005
 The Last Supper: Live at Hammerstein Ballroom, a 2006 Coheed and Cambria concert DVD
 "The Last Supper", a song in the 1970 rock opera Jesus Christ Superstar
 The Last Supper (opera), a 2000 opera

Other arts and entertainment
 The Last Supper (novel), a 1983 novel by Charles McCarry
 "Last Supper" (The Outer Limits), a 1997 episode of The Outer Limits television show
 "The Last Supper," a 1989 episode of War of the Worlds
 The Last Supper, the first entry in the Giovanni Chronicles series of tabletop game books

See also
 Eucharist, or the Lord's Supper
 Last meal, customarily given to a condemned prisoner